Langdale Dam is a lowhead dam on the Chattahoochee River just south of Langdale, Alabama.

The dam was built in 1908 to provide electricity for the former Langdale Mills, and is now owned and operated by Georgia Power.  It produces an average of 1 megawatt of hydroelectric power.

The river here lies entirely on the Georgia side of the state line, but the dam itself does enter into Alabama territory.

Georgia Power has applied for permission to remove Langdale Dam in 2023.

References 

Langdale
Buildings and structures in Chambers County, Alabama
Dams in Alabama
Dams in Georgia (U.S. state)
Buildings and structures in Harris County, Georgia
Georgia Power dams
Dams completed in 1914